Szeged Airport  is an airport serving Szeged, a city in Csongrád county, Hungary.

Facilities
It has one asphalt paved runway designated 16R/34L which measures .

The airport is equipped with NDB and DME.

Statistics

References

External links
 
 

Airports in Hungary
Buildings and structures in Csongrád-Csanád County